Van Dyke, VanDyke or Vandyke  is an Americanized or anglicized form of the Dutch-language toponymic surname Van Dijk, Van Dijke, Van Dijck, or Van Dyck. Meaning living near the dike.

Van Dyke, VanDyke or Vandyke may refer to:

As a surname
The Van Dyke family of American entertainers:
 Dick Van Dyke (born 1925), actor
 Barry Van Dyke (born 1951), actor
 Shane Van Dyke (born 1979), actor, screenwriter, and director
 Jerry Van Dyke (1931–2018), comedian and actor, brother of Dick
 Kelly Jean Van Dyke (1958–1991), actress and adult film performer
Aldo Calderón van Dyke (1968–2013), Honduran journalist and news anchor
Alex Van Dyke (born 1974), American football wide receiver 
Anthony E. Van Dyke, United States Marine Corps colonel
Antony van Dyke, variant English spelling of the Flemish-born painter Anthony van Dyck, (1599–1641)
Arlington P. Van Dyke (1926–1990), American businessman and New York politician
Ben Van Dyke (1888–1973), American baseball pitcher
Bill Van Dyke (1863–1933), American baseball player
Bruce Van Dyke (born 1944), American football guard
Carl Van Dyke (1881–1919), American soldier, lawyer and politician from Minnesota
Charie Van Dyke (born 1965), American film producer
Charlie Van Dyke (born 1947), American former radio disc jockey
Conny Van Dyke (born 1945), American singer and actress
David Van Dyke (born 1959), American serial killer
DeMarcus Van Dyke (born 1989), American football cornerback
Dick van Dyke (politician) (fl. 1985), American (Washington State) politician
Earl Van Dyke (1930–1992), American soul musician, keyboardist for Motown Records
Edwin Van Dyke (1849–1952), American physician and entomologist 
Harry Van Dyke (born 1972), American actor and music producer
Henry van Dyke (1852–1933), American author, educator, and clergyman
Hilary Van Dyke (born 1970), American actress and singer
Inger Vandyke, Australian wildlife photojournalist, explorer and expedition leader
James A. Van Dyke (1813–1855), American lawyer, mayor of Detroit in 1847
Jan Van Dyke (1941–2015), American dancer and choreographer
John van Dyke (canoeist) (born 1935), American sprint canoer
John Van Dyke (politician) (1807–1878), American jurist and Whig Party politician
John Charles Van Dyke (1856–1932), American art historian and critic
John Wesley Van Dyke (1849–1939), American oil refiner
Joost van Dyke (died c.1631), Dutch privateer in the West Indies
Lawrence VanDyke (1972 - ), American judge
Leroy Van Dyke (born 1929), American auctioneer and singer
Les Vandyke (1931–2021), English pop singer and songwriter
Louis van Dyke, international spelling of Louis van Dijk (born 1941), Dutch pianist
Marcia Van Dyke (1922–2002), American violinist and actress, niece of W.S. Van Dyke
Matthew VanDyke (born 1979), American documentary filmmaker and Prisoner of War in the Libyan civil war
Milton Van Dyke (1922–2010), American aerospace engineer and aerodynamicist
Nicholas Van Dyke (governor) (1738–1789), American lawyer and President of Delaware
Nicholas Van Dyke (senator) (1770–1826), American lawyer and Senator from Delaware
Paul Van Dyke (1859–1933), American historian, brother of Henry Van Dyke
Phillip Van Dyke (born 1984), American voice actor
Ria van Dyke (born 1989), New Zealand model and beauty pageant
Ronny van Dyke, stage name of Jörg T. Hartmann (born 1956), German singer and songwriter
Russ Van Dyke (1917–1992), radio and television newsman in Iowa
Ryan Van Dyke (born 1980), American football quarterback
Vonda Kay Van Dyke (born 1943), American model, 1965 Miss America
W. S. Van Dyke (1889–1943), American film director
Walter Van Dyke (1823–1905), American justice of the California Supreme Court
Willard Van Dyke (1906–1986), American filmmaker, photographer, and Museum of Modern Art director

As a derived given or middle name
Van Dyke Brooke, stage name of Stewart McKerrow (1859–1921), American actor, screenwriter and film director
Van Dyke Parks (born 1943), American musician and actor
Walter Van Dyke Bingham (1880–1952), American applied and industrial psychologist
Henry Vandyke Carter (1831–1897), English anatomist, surgeon, and anatomical artist
Anthony Vandyke Copley Fielding (1787–1855), English painter 
Henry Van Dyke Johns (1803–1859), American Episcopal clergyman, Chaplain of the Senate
Samuel Van Dyke Stout (1786–1850), American (Tennessee) Whig politician

Places
Jost Van Dyke, island of the British Virgin Islands named after Joost van Dyk
M-53 (Michigan highway), highway in the U.S. state of Michigan known as Van Dyke Avenue and Van Dyke Road in Metro Detroit
Van Dyke, Michigan, former community in the United States
Vandyke, Texas, unincorporated community in Comanche County
Vandyke, Virginia, unincorporated community named after the postmaster Henry Vandyke
Van Dyke Public Schools, Michigan school district
Vandyke Upper School, School in Bedfordshire, England

Others
Van Dyke beard, 19th century name for a style of beard, as worn by the painter and his subjects
Van Dyke brown, colour, named after the painter Anthony van Dyck
Van Dyke brown (printing), printing process named after Anthony van Dyck
Van Dyke mango, a named mango cultivar that originated in south Florida
Vandyke Productions, British film production company between 1947 and 1956
Van Dyke Records, American record label from about early 1929 through 1932

See also
 The Van Dykes, a group of traveling lesbian separatists from the late 1970s
 Dyke (surname)
 van (Dutch) 
 Van Dijk
 Van Dyck (surname)
 Van Dyk

Americanized surnames